Holoparasitus is a genus of mites in the family Parasitidae.

Species
 Holoparasitus ampullaris Witalinski, 1994     
 Holoparasitus apenninorum (Berlese, 1906)     
 Holoparasitus calcaratus (C.L.Koch, 1839)     
 Holoparasitus cornutus Juvara-Bals & Witalinski, 2000     
 Holoparasitus crassisetosus Juvara-Bals & Witalinski, 2000     
 Holoparasitus cultriger (Berlese, 1906)     
 Holoparasitus dallaii Witalinski, 1993     
 Holoparasitus digitiformis Juvara-Bals & Witalinski, 2000     
 Holoparasitus ellipticus Juvara-Bals & Witalinski, 2000     
 Holoparasitus excipuliger (Berlese, 1903)     
 Holoparasitus gibber Juvara-Bals & Witalinski, 2000     
 Holoparasitus globosus Witalinski, 1994     
 Holoparasitus inventus Vinnik, 1994     
 Holoparasitus kerkirensis Witalinski & Skorupski, 2003     
 Holoparasitus lawrencei Hyatt, 1987     
 Holoparasitus maritimus Hyatt, 1987     
 Holoparasitus megacalcaratus Schmolzer, 1995     
 Holoparasitus micherdzinskii Witalinski, 1981     
 Holoparasitus paradisiacus Witalinski & Skorupski, 2003     
 Holoparasitus peraltus (Berlese, 1903)     
 Holoparasitus pollicipatus (Berlese, 1903)     
 Holoparasitus pseudoperforatus (Berlese, 1903)     
 Holoparasitus siculus (Berlese, 1906)     
 Holoparasitus vasilei Juvara-Bals, 1995

References

Parasitidae